Deepak Gupta is an Indian researcher, software developer, and writer. He is a cyber security expert and an author of handbooks such as the Handbook of Computer Networks and Cyber Security and the Handbook of Research on Multimedia Cyber Security.

Education
Gupta earned a Master of Science in Computer Forensics and Cyber Security from the Illinois Institute of Technology in Chicago. As a graduate student, Gupta worked on and led VOIP-related research projects for Bell Labs.

Career
After finishing his graduate studies, Gupta worked at Sageworks. As a software developer, he created a centralized integration process for porting customers' data to the company's database. In 2011, Gupta founded CIAM and social API provider LoginRadius with his friend and co-founder Rakesh Soni. At first, it was based in Edmonton, Canada, but then later set up offices in San Francisco, California. It also has offices in Vancouver, Jaipur, and Hyderabad.

Publications
Gupta has written various articles and books on cybersecurity and various other IT topics.

In 2018, Gupta contributed a chapter to the book Computer and Cyber Security: Principles, Algorithm, Applications, and Perspectives. He has served as an editor for the 2019 volume Handbook of Computer Networks and Cyber Security: Principles and Paradigms.

Additionally, Gupta has served as an editor for the 2020 volume Handbook of Research on Multimedia Cyber Security.

Gupta is also writing another book titled The Power of Digital Identity in 2021. He has also written articles for Forbes, FastCompany,  DevOps.com, and others.

Books
Mishra, A., Gupta, B., & Gupta, D. (2018). Identity theft, malware, and social engineering in dealing with cybercrime. In Gupta, B., Agrawal, D. P., & Wang, H. (eds.). Computer and cyber security: Principles, algorithm, applications, and perspectives. (pp. 627–649). United States: CRC Press. 
Gupta, D., Agrawal, D. P., Perez, G. M., Gupta, B. B. (2019). Handbook of computer networks and cyber security: Principles and paradigms. Germany: Springer International Publishing. 
Gupta, B., & Gupta, D. (eds.). (2020). Handbook of research on multimedia cyber security. IGI Global, Information Science Reference (an imprint of IGI Global).

Research
Gupta's patents include:

Method and system for defense against Distributed Denial-of-Service attack, Peraković, D., Gupta, B.B., Gupta, D., Mishra, A., AU2021102049A
Method and system of performing a fine-grained searchable encryption for resource-constrained devices in m-health network, Nguyen, T., Castiglione, A., Gupta, B.B., Gupta, D., Mamta, AU2021102048A4

References

Indian software engineers
Scientists at Bell Labs
Illinois Institute of Technology alumni
Living people
Year of birth missing (living people)